Subhamita Banerjee is a Bengali singer from Malda, India, who specializes in modern songs, Ghazals etc. She has many Bengali albums to her credit and is one of the well known singers in the Bengali music industry.

Personal life
Banerjee was born in a Bengali musical family. Her father, Shri Joshoda Dulal Das, a classical vocalist, was her first Guru who gave her the basic training in music. She also took training from gurus including Pandit Ulhas Kashalkar of Jaipur Gwalior Gharana, Aniruddha Bhattacharya of Kirana Gharana and Vidushi Purnima Chowdhury of Benares Gharana and also trained in different classical styles of Purab Ang Thumri, Dadra, Chaiti, Kajri traditions. Subhamita completed her graduation with Honors in English from Kolkata University and Masters in English from Rabindra Bharati University in the 1998.

Discography
 Abishkar -Taal Audio
 Phire Dekha -Taal Audio
 Ichhe Paari (2004) Sagarika Music
 Brishti Paye Paye (2005) Sagarika Music
 Moner Hodish (2006) Sagarika Music
 Gopano Kathati (2006) Sagarika Music
 Jodi Bondhu Hao (2007) Sagarika Music
 Chal Gaan Bhese (2009) Sagarika Music
 Arunobani (2010) Sagarika Music
 Meghe Ora Chithi (Letters in the Sky) (2011) Sagarika Music
 Shreya 'O' Subhamita (2013) Sagarika Music
 Poila Nambar (2014) Ragranjani Media & Entertainment
 Dui Du Gune Prem (2014) Asha Audio
 Tomay Bhalobeshe (2015) Asha Audio
 Ghalibnama (2017) Asha Audio

Discography (Films)
Bhagshesh: The Remainder (2018)
Cheeni (2020)

Awards
 Offered Scholarship from ITC Sangeet Research Academy, Kolkata.
 Recipient of National Scholarship from the Government of India in 1992.
 Placed First in HMV Golden Talent Contest in 1993.
 Placed First in Sa Theke Sa which aired on ETV Bangla.
 Released nearly a dozen album of Bengali Songs. 
 Lent voice in more than 200 Tele-Serial and Bengali Films.
 3 Times Winner of Best Female Singer Award in Tele-Serial Category in 2006, 2007 & 2008.
 Recipient of 3 awards from Anand Bazaar Patrika and 91.9 FM including ‘Best Female Singer Award'
 Best Female Singer Award  – Radio Mirchi −2012

Adhunik Female Vocalist of the Decade Sherar Shera - Smule Mirchi Music Awards Bangla, co-powered by Shikhar Pan Masala  −2021
Awarded 17 th Tumi Annanya 2022 for Excellence in Music

Performances
 Special performance in Pandit Ravi Shankarji's project in the event "India Calling" in Los Angeles, United States in 2009.
 Her song in the film Memories in March got immensely popular and which was written by Rituparna Ghosh and directed by Debojyoti Mishra
 In July 2011 she performed in a music festival called Guru Shishya Parampara organized jointly by East Zone Cultural Centre and SRA
 She participated in the ITC SRA Sangeet Sammelan in 2011
""

References

External links
 

Bengali singers
Indian women singer-songwriters
Indian singer-songwriters
Living people
Singers from Kolkata
People from Malda district
21st-century Indian singers
21st-century Indian women singers
Women musicians from West Bengal
Rabindra Bharati University alumni
University of Calcutta alumni
1972 births